Paiska Union is a union parishad of Dhanbari Upazila, Tangail District, Bangladesh. It is situated 64 km north of Tangail.

Demographics

According to Population Census 2011 performed by Bangladesh Bureau of Statistics, The total population of Paiska union is 21152. There are 5587 households in total.

Education

The literacy rate of Paiska Union is 42.5% (Male-44.4%, Female-40.7%).

See also
 Union Councils of Tangail District

References

Populated places in Dhaka Division
Populated places in Tangail District
Unions of Dhanbari Upazila